Kadambari is a 1976 Bollywood drama film directed by H. K. Verma. The film stars Vijay Arora and Shabana Azmi in lead roles.  It was the debut film of playback singer Kavita Krishnamurthy's career.

Cast
Vijay Arora   
Shabana Azmi  
Aparna Choudhury

Plot
The Story revolves around the life of the protagonist- a woman ( played by Shabana Azmi)- kind-hearted and mature- fells in love with a Shy man (Played by Vijay Arora)- always afraid of her mother. She convinces him to fight against his mother for the decision of his controlled life with sheer self-confidence and determination.

Songs
The music was composed by Vilayat Khan. 
"Kyon Hum Tum Rahe Akele" - Ajit Singh
"Aayega Aanewala" - Kavita Krishnamurthy
"Ambar Ki Ek Paak Suhani" - Asha Bhosle

Reception
Author Bibekanada Ray described the film as one of the low-budgeted films starring Azmi with "strong storylines and literary flavour". The Illustrated Weekly of India reported that Azmi had performed brilliantly in the film. The film did not attract an audience.

References

External links
 

1976 films
1970s Hindi-language films
1976 drama films
Indian drama films